The 2005 Individual Long Track/Grasstrack World Championship was the 35th edition of the FIM speedway Individual Long Track World Championship.

The world title was won by Robert Barth of Germany for the third time.

Venues

Final Classification

References 

2005
Speedway competitions in France
Speedway competitions in Germany
Long